Pedicinus is a genus of sucking louse, the only genus in the family Pedicinidae. Species belonging to this genus are found on Old World monkeys and apes of different kinds. Pedicinus, along with its sister genus Pthirus, are believed to have diverged from their common ancestor approximately 22.5-2.5 million years ago.

Pedicinus has been studied on a genetic level by researchers looking for insight into the evolutionary history of their primate hosts.

Species 

 Pedicinus albidus - Rudow, 1869
 Pedicinus ancoratus - Ferris, 1934    
 Pedicinus badii - Kuhn and Ludwig, 1964    
 Pedicinus cercocebi - Kuhn and Ludwig, 1967    
 Pedicinus colobi - Fahrenholz, 1917    
 Pedicinus cynopitheci - Kuhn and Ludwig, 1967    
 Pedicinus eurygaster - Burmeister, 1838
 Pedicinus ferrisi - Kuhn and Ludwig, 1965
 Pedicinus hamadryas - Mjöberg, 1910    
 Pedicinus miopitheci - Kuhn and Ludwig, 1970    
 Pedicinus obtusus - Rudow, 1869  
 Pedicinus patas - Fahrenholz, 1916
 Pedicinus pictus - Ferris, 1934    
 Pedicinus veri - Kuhn and Ludwig, 1963

Species data retrieved from Integrated Taxonomic Information System.

References 

Lice
Parasites of primates